Flipper is a 1996 American adventure film, and a remake of the 1963 film of the same name (which in turn began a TV series that ran from 1964 to 1967). Written and directed by Alan Shapiro, the film stars Elijah Wood as Sandy Ricks, a boy who has to spend the summer with his Uncle Porter (Paul Hogan), who lives on the Florida Gold Coast. Although he expects to have a boring summer, he encounters a dolphin whom he names Flipper and with whom he forms a friendship.

The film is unrelated to the 1995–2000 TV series of the same name that was itself also a remake of the 1963 film and 1964 TV series. Instead of Metro-Goldwyn-Mayer, a production company for the Flipper franchise, this film is distributed by Universal Pictures.

Plot 
Sandy Ricks is sent off for the summer to stay with his Uncle Porter in the seaside town of Coral Key. Initially, Sandy is unenthusiastic and disappointed that he is not going to a Red Hot Chili Peppers concert. His mood remains unchanged even after meeting Cathy, a local shopkeeper with whom his uncle carries on a flirtatious relationship, and Kim, a girl his own age.

While out on Porter's fishing trawler, they meet Porter's enemy, Dirk Moran. Nearby, a pod of Bottlenose dolphins is frolicking near Dirk's boat. As a big game fisherman, Dirk Moran makes it plain that he hates just about every other fish-eating animal on earth and shoots at the pod ending with a dolphin being fatally shot. Sandy meets a dolphin that escaped Dirk's shooting, and eventually names it Flipper.

The next morning, Porter and Sandy are paid a visit by the sheriff Buck Cowan, who explains that they could not keep the dolphin unless he is in captivity. That night, Sandy and Kim set out on a dinghy to look for Flipper. They fail to locate the dolphin, but see the dumping of barrels off of Dirk Moran's boat. The next morning, as Kim arrives looking for Sandy, Pete, Porter's pet brown pelican, comes running as if asking her to follow him. Pete leads Kim to Flipper who is beached on the shore and sick. They manage to cure Flipper anyhow.

Cathy determines that Flipper has been poisoned by toxic waste, which is also shown to have been ruining the local fishing. The group uses Flipper's ability of echolocation and a special camera attached to his head to help them locate the barrels of toxic waste. Flipper also manages to locate the rest of his pod, and reunites with them, in the process, dropping the camera. Porter rushes back to alert the sheriff about the barrels. Sandy, however becomes concerned that something has happened to Flipper, without informing anyone except Kathy's young son, Marvin, who sets off in the dinghy to find him.

Sandy barely survives an encounter with Dirk Moran's boat, which dismantles the dinghy. He sees an approaching dorsal fin and thinks it is Flipper, but it is actually Scar, a large great hammerhead shark that has been lurking in the island's waters and is said to have taken out a tourist boat. Sandy swims for his life towards Dirk's boat. As Scar is about to attack Sandy, Flipper appears and starts nose-butting him in the gills. There is a harrowing moment when Scar proves stronger than Flipper, but Flipper's dolphin pod comes to his aid in the nick of time and drive Scar away. Dirk Moran is then arrested by the sheriff for illegally dumping toxic waste and attempting to kill Sandy since he knew that he saw them that night.

The next morning, when Sandy's mother and younger sister arrive to pick him up, there is a commotion. It is Flipper, who has come to see Sandy off.

Cast 
 Paul Hogan as Porter Ricks
 Elijah Wood as Sandy Ricks
 Jessica Wesson as Kim Parker
 Jonathan Banks as Dirk Moran
 Bill Kelley as Donald
 Chelsea Field as Cathy
 Isaac Hayes as Sheriff Buck Cowan
 Jason Fuchs as Marvin
 Robert Deacon as Bounty Fisherman #1
 Ann Carey as Fisherman's Friend 
 Mark Casella as Bounty Fisherman #2
 Luke Halpin as Bounty Fisherman #3

Production 
The film was shot in the Bahamas. Animatronic dolphins, designed by Walt Conti and his team, had to be used extensively, such as in scenes where Flipper interacts with the human characters, or is shown swimming along. Conti stated that using real dolphins does not work as well as many might think.  Nevertheless, a trio of real dolphins did interact with star Elijah Wood during production, with Wood saying that he enjoyed the opportunity to swim with them.

Reception

Box office 
The film debuted at No. 2 behind Twister with $4.5 million. Flipper ultimately grossed $20 million domestically, on a $25 million budget.

Critical response 
Joe Leydon of Variety criticized the plot but appreciated the performances of Hogan, Wood, Wesson, Hayes and Field, as well as the animatronic work on the film. Dwayne E. Leslie of Boxoffice noted the scene where a hammerhead shark attacks a seabird, which brings to mind similar footage from National Geographic, may be shocking for very young children.

Rotten Tomatoes gives the film a 30% approval rating based on reviews from 20 critics. 
On Metacritic it has a score of 43% based on reviews from 19 critics, indicating "mixed or average reviews".
Audiences surveyed by CinemaScore gave the film a grade of "A−" on a scale of A+ to F.

Accolades 

The film's tagline, "This summer it's finally safe to go back in the water." references the tagline of the 1978 feature film Jaws 2, "Just when you thought it was safe to go back in the water..."

Home media 
The film was released on DVD in 2003 by Universal Studios Home Entertainment, available in both 16x9 anamorphic widescreen and 4x3 fullscreen editions. In 2007, a widescreen-only print of Flipper was released in a four film package alongside The Little Rascals, Casper, and Leave It to Beaver. Dubbed "Family Favorites 4 Movie Collection: Franchise Collection", all four films are based on popular TV shows. Flipper was later released on Blu-ray on February 8, 2011.

References

External links 

1996 films
1990s adventure films
1990s children's adventure films
1990s teen films
American adventure films
American children's adventure films
Films about dolphins
Films set in Florida
Remakes of American films
Films shot in the Bahamas
Films set in amusement parks
Films scored by Joel McNeely
Universal Pictures films
1990s English-language films
1990s American films